Live at Donington (released on VHS as Donington Live 1992) is a live album and video by the English heavy metal band Iron Maiden, documenting their second headlining appearance at the Monsters of Rock festival at Donington Park, a motorsport circuit located near Castle Donington. The concert took place on 22 August 1992 during the Fear of the Dark Tour in front of a crowd of almost 80,000.

It was originally only released as a limited edition triple vinyl set, with a 2 disc CD release only in Brazil, Canada, Holland, Italy, South Korea, UK and Japan. It spent a single week on the UK album chart.

Guitarist Adrian Smith joins the band on this version of "Running Free".

Live at Donington became a regular part of the band's CD catalogue with the 1998 reissues. Replacing the original plain white cover, with the band's logo in black, the 1998 reissue uses the original concert poster by Mark Wilkinson. The track list was spread differently, to make room for a multimedia section on disc two.

Track listing

Notes
 To make room for the multimedia section on the second disc of the 1998 remaster, "Bring Your Daughter... to the Slaughter", "The Clairvoyant", "Heaven Can Wait" and "Run to the Hills" were moved to disc one.

Credits
Production and performance credits are adapted from the album liner notes.
Iron Maiden
 Bruce Dickinson – vocals
 Dave Murray – guitar
 Janick Gers – guitar
 Steve Harris – bass guitar, producer, mixing
 Nicko McBrain – drums
Additional musicians
 Michael Kenney – keyboards
 Adrian Smith – guitar on "Running Free"
Production
 Mick McKenna – engineer
 Tim Young – mastering
 Hugh Gilmour – reissue design
 Rod Smallwood – management
 Andy Taylor – management

Charts

Certifications
VHS

References

Iron Maiden live albums
Iron Maiden video albums
1993 live albums
1993 video albums
Live heavy metal albums
Live video albums
EMI Records live albums
Picture Music International video albums